FKBP14 is a gene which codes for a structural protein named FKBP prolyl isomerase 14. This protein is believed to aid in the process of procollagen folding and is located in the endoplasmic reticulum that functions to process and transport proteins. Procollagens are collagen precursors located in the extracellular matrix that give tissues elasticity, strength, and support. This gene is involved in patterning the collagen structure. FKBP prolyl isomerase 14 may also be involved in altering other factors in the extracellular matrix. Mutations of this gene are associated with the kyphoscoliotic type of Ehlers-Danlos syndrome. This condition is characterized by a high range of joint movement, muscle atrophy, curved spine, and delicate cardiovascular vessels. These symptoms are brought about by a loss of the protein which results in a disruption of endoplasmic reticulum activities and extracellular matrix organization. FKBP14 mRNA levels are found higher in ovarian cancer tissues than healthy ovarian tissue and knocked down expression of FKBP14 by lentiviral shRNA leads to an impaired proliferative ability of ovarian cancer cells.

References 

Human genes